Snow Day is a 2022 musical comedy film directed by Michael Lembeck from a story by Samantha Martin and Chris Viscardi. Produced by Nickelodeon Movies, the film is a remake of the 2000 film of the same name. Reimagined as a musical, it stars Ky Baldwin, Jerry Trainor, Laura Bell Bundy, Rob Huebel, Michaela Russell, Shelby Simmons, and Fabi Aguirre. It was released on Nickelodeon and Paramount+ on December 16, 2022.

Plot
Siblings Hal and Natalie discover that anything is possible when a surprise winter whiteout offers them the chance to break routines and take big risks. Hal decides to pursue his crush, Claire, while Natalie challenges the town's cranky snowplow man.

Cast
 Fabi Aguirre as Lane
 Logan Aultman as Eli Welch
 Deena Aziz as Ms. Reynolds
 Ky Baldwin as Hal Brandston
 Lilly Noelle Bartlam as Missy
 Dave Campbell as Rebecca’s Dad
 Anastastia Dextrene as News Reporter Debra
 Myles Erlick as Chuck Wheeler
 Nir Guzinski as Mr. Brown
 Viggo Hanvelt as Randy Brandston
 Rob Huebel as Tom Brandston
 Morgan David Jones as Director
 Dominic Mariache as Wayne Castle
 Lisa McCormack as Miss Johnson
 Evelyne Morissette as Passerby
 Oliver Ocampo as Dirk
 Destiny Rettinger as Mason
 Michaela Russell as Natalie Brandston
 Shelby Simmons as Claire
 Melissa Toussaint as Nurse Johnson
 Jerry Trainor as Snowplow Man

Production
On March 1, 2022 it was announced that Paramount+ had began production on a musical remake of the 2000 Nickelodeon film Snow Day. The cast was unveiled alongside the announcement. Like the original film, it was shot primarily in Canadian territories despite being set in Syracuse, New York.

Soundtrack
The film’s soundtrack was composed by Gabriel Mann. The soundtrack album was released alongside the film by Republic Records.

Release

Marketing
A trailer was released on November 17, 2022 alongside the film’s poster.

Release
Snow Day was made available to stream on Paramount+ on December 16, 2022. It also premiered on Nickelodeon the same day, and was made available on international Paramount+ services the following day.

Reception
Like the original, the film received mixed reviews from critics. John Serba of Decider gave the film a negative review, saying that "None of this slapdash also-ran cheapo crud is for anyone older than 10 or younger than nine and seven-eighths" and that "If a blizzard cancels school, have the kids watch something else." Joly Herman of Common Sense Media gave the film a 3/5, saying that "Viewers might wonder whether the theme of having a snow day is deserving of a full-length musical movie, but as soon as that thought enters the head, a fun dance number distracts, and some clever songs can elicit a smile."

References